Meroctena staintonii is a moth in the family Crambidae. It was described by Julius Lederer in 1863. It is found in Indonesia (Ambon Island, Java, Borneo), Fiji and Australia, where it has been recorded from Queensland

References

Moths described in 1863
Spilomelinae